Nery Mantey Niangkouara (born March 14, 1983 in Athens, Greece) is a Greek swimmer. She began her career at Nereus Halandri and then moved on to Panathinaikos. In 2001, she won 2 silver medals at the Mediterranean Games in the 100m and relay races. She was 5th in the European Championships in 2002 in Relay 4Ch100. She won the first medal for the Greek colors in the European Swimming Championships in Madrid, with a time of 55.05 in the 100m free. In the 2004 Olympics in Athens she was 6th in the 100m free and 7th in the 50 meters, and was disqualified in the 4 × 100 m free.

At the end of July 2005 she took 7th place at the World Aquatics Championships in Montreal in the final of the 100m free.

In 2006, she continued her streak of very good performances. Neri Niangkouara qualified for the final 100 meters free with performance of the 2nd semi (54.63, record, old 54.81 own by August 14, 2004) the European Aquatic Championships in Budapest in August 2006. Niangkouara managed to finish in third place in the final, August 2, 2006, with the national record (54.48). The old record was all of the previous day, 54.63.

In 2007 Niagkouara had good position in the International Military Games in India in the 50 meter freestyle, and finished in 6th place with 25.65.

In November 2007, Neri announced her decision to retire. However, she came back in style in 2012, competing at the Olympics again. As of September 2013 she is also a swimming trainer of Panathinaikos' youth academies.
She is the daughter of a Kenyan father and a Greek mother.

References

1983 births
Olympic swimmers of Greece
Greek female swimmers
Greek people of Kenyan descent
Swimmers at the 2004 Summer Olympics
Swimmers at the 2012 Summer Olympics
Swimmers from Athens
Living people
European Aquatics Championships medalists in swimming
Panathinaikos swimmers
Mediterranean Games gold medalists for Greece
Mediterranean Games medalists in swimming
Swimmers at the 2001 Mediterranean Games